Curry paste usually refers to a paste used as a cooking ingredient in the preparation of a curry. There are different varieties of curry paste depending from the region and also within the same cuisine:
Indian curry pastes
Kroeung paste of Cambodian cuisine
Kore paste of Laotian cuisine
Thai curry paste

See also
Curry powder
Masala

Food paste
Curry